Solar Science is an educational television series. The series appeared on The Science Channel cable network. The program was hosted by Bill Ratner.

The program's main subject was the solar system. The episodes were "The Edge Of Darkness", "A Star Is Born" and "Heavens Above".

References

Astronomy education television series